The 2011 Challenger Banque Nationale de Rimouski was a professional tennis tournament played on indoor hard courts. It was the 5th edition of the tournament and part of the 2011 ATP Challenger Tour, offering a total of $35,000 in prize money. It took place in Rimouski, Canada between March 14 and March 20, 2011.

Singles main-draw entrants

Seeds

1 Rankings are as of March 7, 2011

Other entrants
The following players received wildcards into the singles main draw:
 Daniel Chu
 Ahmed El-Tabakh
 Pavel Krainik
 Robert Rotaru

The following players received entry from the qualifying draw:
 David Rice
 Julien Dubail
 Albano Olivetti
 Blake Strode

Champions

Singles

 Fritz Wolmarans def.  Bobby Reynolds, 6–7(2–7), 6–3, 7–6(7–3)

Doubles

 Treat Conrad Huey /  Vasek Pospisil def.  David Rice /  Sean Thornley, 6–0, 6–1

External links
Official website

Challenger Banque Nationale de Rimouski
Challenger de Drummondville
Challenger Banque Nationale de Rimouski
Challenger Banque Nationale de Rimouski
Challenger Banque Nationale de Rimouski